Rogulichny is a rural locality (a settlement) in Sibirsky Selsoviet, Pervomaysky District, Altai Krai, Russia. The population was 414 as of 2013. There are 4 streets.

Geography 
Rogulichny is located 36 km north of Novoaltaysk (the district's administrative centre) by road. Ozyorki is the nearest rural locality.

References 

Rural localities in Pervomaysky District, Altai Krai